is a former Japanese football player and manager. He managed Japan women's national team.

Coaching career
Suzuki was born on June 12, 1949. After graduating from Tokai University, he went to West Germany in 1973 and became a coach. In January 1986, he became a manager for Japan women's national team. In December, Japan participated in 1986 AFC Women's Championship in Hong Kong and won the 2nd place. He managed Japan until January 1989. In 1990, he became a manager for new club Nikko Securities Dream Ladies. The club won the champions at 1990 Empress's Cup. The club participated L.League from 1991. The club was 4th place in 1991 season and he resigned end of the season.

References

1949 births
Living people
Tokai University alumni
Japanese footballers
Japanese football managers
Japan women's national football team managers
Association footballers not categorized by position